Versalles is a town and  municipality located in the Department of Valle del Cauca, Colombia.

Versalles is a town near El Dovio and Roldanillo. It has a somewhat cooler climate than those towns, being situated at a higher altitude.

External links 
 

Municipalities of Valle del Cauca Department